Senior Tigers is the nickname of the 1st East Bengal Regiment of Bangladesh Army.

History
1st East Bengal Regiment is the oldest battalion of the East Bengal Regiment (the first of the two infantry regiments in the Bangladeshi Army, the other being the Bangladesh Infantry Regiment). The unit was raised in 1948 at Kurmitola in Dhaka in what was then East Pakistan from two Bengal Muslim Pioneer Corps (1256 and 1407) of British Indian Army Pioneer Corps from Bihar Regiments, the war raised auxiliary force created to support the war effort in engineering and infantry role. These two companies were mainly composed of Bengali Muslims who had fought bravely in the Burma sector during the Second World War and as such had been retained by the British Government with the mainstream of the British-Indian Army. These two companies immediately after the partition of India in August 1947 moved from Jalna the Indian Pioneer Corps Centre initially to Pelkhana then to Kurmitola which is now Dhaka Cantonment. The first commanding officer C.O. of the Senior Tigers was a British officer named Lieutenant Colonel V J E Patterson and the Officer Commanding O.C. of the Senior Tigers was a senior Bengali Officer Major Abdul Waheed Choudhury raised and commanded the regiment and lifted it to 1st Battalion with his relentless effort and sacrifices with limited resources and through adverse situations.

The unit took part in the 1965 Pakistan - India war, the war of 1967, the 1971 liberation war of Bangladesh, the 1990 Kuwait war and has served in various peacekeeping roles. The unit is a proud recipient of red piping — a decoration for their gallant contribution in the liberation war of Bangladesh.

It includes a Bir Shreshtho (The highest gallantry award of Bangladesh) amongst its numbers and many other gallantry award recipients. The raising day of the unit, 15 February, is also known as 'Tigers Day' in the Bangladesh Army.

Commanders
The regiment was raised and commanded by senior most Bengali Commander Major Abdul Waheed Choudhury. Officer Commanding O.C. of the Senior Tigers was a WWll veteran and late of the British Indian Army and Pakistan Army. The unit has been commanded by some of the most renowned officers of the Bangladeshi Army. It is also unique in that it has been headed by an Air force Officer for a very brief period during the war of liberation in 1971. The Commander-in-Chief of the Bangladeshi Forces during the liberation war, General M A G Osmani, was the commanding officer (CO) in 1950 at Jessore. Colonel A T K Haq, Major General Sadeque, Major General A M Abdul Wadud BP, Brigadier General Hossain Mohd Sadeq, Brigadier General Shah Md Sultan Uddin Iqbal Bir Protik, Major General Ehteshamul Haque, Colonel Mohabbat have all left their mark on the unit.  In addition, Major General Quazi Golam Dastgir, KAAO, psc was commissioned in the First Bengal Regiment and as a Lieutenant Colonel served as the Commanding Officer from 1969 to 1970 while the battalion was posted in Jessore.

Deployment
The unit has probably served in all the divisional formations of the Bangladesh Army. At present it is in the Order of Battle (ORBAT) of the 66th Infantry Division. The unit's former CO General Dastgir served as the Ambassador of Bangladesh to Saudi Arabia during the first Gulf War and was instrumental in the selection of the Senior Tigers  as Bangladesh's contingent under the United Nations command during Operation Desert Storm—and this pioneered the way for Bangladeshi troops participating in future UN forces.  The unit had been reorganized temporarily to serve the UN Mission as BANBAT 17 (Bangladeshi Battalion 17). The previous CO of 1st Bengal, Lt Col Shakil, had been transferred to SI&T while Lt Col Motlub Ahmed, afwc, psc had taken command of BANBAT 17. The Battalion was also commanded by Lt Col Salahuddin Khaled whose father was also the CO of the same Battalion. Lt Col Azaher Uddin Ahammed, psc being the 51st CO of the traditional Battalion has left his distinct footprint, when the unit made significant leap forward in various fields of professionalism through a renovation program. The Battalion is now being commanded by Lt Col Mohammad Saiful Islam,  psc.

The unit was deployed to Liberia for its UN mission. Its first flight landed on 17 April, its arrival in Liberia was complete on 4 May 2009. The unit, after completing its tour of duty in Liberia, returned to Bangladesh and reorganized as a regular infantry battalion under the ORBAT of 9 Infantry Division. At present the Battalion is under ORBAT of 66 Infantry Division. Currently the Battalion is deployed in Rooppur Nuclear Power Plant as Interim Response Force.

References

Further reading
 The Detective. Vol. 10. Dacca: East Pakistan Police Co-operative Society. 1965. p. 197 
 The Pakistan Review. Vol. 15. 1967. p. 42 
 Pakistan News Digest. Vol. 15. 1967. Principal Information Officer, Press Information Department 
 The Tempest. Vol. 3. 1968. Tempest House. p. 82 
 Defence Journal. Vol. 12. 1986. Karachi. pp. 3–5 
 Defence Journal. Vol. 11. 2007. Karachi. p. 79 
 
 
 
 

Regiments of Bangladesh
Infantry battalions